The Tarapacá Region is one of Chile's 16 first-order administrative divisions. It comprises two provinces, Iquique and Tamarugal. It borders the Chilean Arica y Parinacota Region to the north, Bolivia's Oruro Department and Potosí Department on the east, Chile's Antofagasta Region to the south and the Pacific Ocean to the west. The port city of Iquique is the region's capital.

Much of the region was once the Tarapacá Province of Peru, which was annexed by Chile under the 1883 Treaty of Ancón at the close of the War of the Pacific. The region was important economically as a site of intense saltpeter mining, before synthetic nitrate manufacturing became possible.  A number of abandoned mining towns can still be found in the region.

The present day Tarapacá Region was created in 2007 by subdividing the former Tarapacá Region under Law No. 20,175, which was signed by President Michelle Bachelet in Arica.

Administration
The government of the region resides in the intendant, who is assigned by the president. Each of the region's two provinces are further subdivided into communes.

Climate
A desert climate dominates the region. Near the coast, cloudiness can limit the temperature swing throughout the day, but in other drier areas, temperatures can vary greatly as is typical in deserts.

Rivers
Isluga River
Cariquima
Concosa (Altiplano)

Economic activities
Fishing
Tourism
Mining
Cerro Colorado
Collahuasi

See also
2007 Tocopilla earthquake
Coastal Cliff of northern Chile
Pulpería

References

External links
Gobierno Regional de Tarapacá Official website 

 
Regions of Chile
States and territories established in 1883
1883 establishments in Chile